CGB2 may refer to:
CGB2 (gene)
Carstairs/Bishell's Airport, Alberta, Canada: Transport Canada Location indicator: CGB2